Sainab Ugas Yasin is a Somali politician. She was a member of Puntland parliament in power for two consecutive terms (from 1998 to 2007). Later, she served as deputy minister of finance at puntland government. Apart from her career as a politician, she is an advocate for women’s participation in politics.

Background
Sainab was born in the northeastern city of Bosaso. Her farher is grand Ugas of Harti clans. She attained degree in social science at Somali National University.

References

Living people
Puntland politicians
Year of birth missing (living people)